Yorick is a character in William Shakespeare's Hamlet. 

Yorick may also refer to:
 Yorick, a character from The Life and Opinions of Tristram Shandy, Gentleman
 Yorick, a Muppet from Sam and Friends
 Yorick (programming language)

People with the name
Yorick Antheunis (born 1991), Belgian footballer
Yorick Smythies (1917–1980), British philosopher
Yorick Treille (born 1980), French ice hockey player
Yorick van Wageningen (born 1964), Dutch actor
Yorick Wilks (born 1939), British computer scientist
Yorick Williams (born 1975), British basketball player